For the first 31 seasons of Boise State football, the Broncos competed at the two-year junior college level. From 1933 to 1964, the school was known as Boise Junior College, then from 1965 to 1967 it was known as Boise College.

Boise Junior College football started in 1933, one year after the school's establishment. The team initially competed at Public School Field before moving to the on-campus College Field (also known as Chaffee Field) in 1940. Under head coaches Dusty Kline, Max Eiden, and Harry Jacoby, the Broncos only saw modest results. In the early 1940s, the program was disrupted by the outbreak of World War II—in 1941, coach Jacoby was called into Army service, forcing George "Stub" Allison to fill in for the remainder of that season. In 1942, the program was forced to go on hiatus due to depleted male enrollment at the college. In 1946, with the war over, the program returned under Jacoby, and in 1947 first-year assistant Lyle Smith was promoted to head coach.

Boise saw tremendous success under Smith, who won his first 37 games as a head coach (interrupted by a period in 1950 and 1951 in which Smith was called into Naval service in Korea and George Blankley took over as head coach and also saw success). The program moved into a new stadium, Bronco Stadium, in 1950. Success for the Broncos continued throughout the 1950s under Smith, culminating in a NJCAA national championship in 1958. That success continued well into the 1960s, with the Broncos ultimately earning 13 Intermountain Collegiate Athletic Conference football titles, by far the most for a single school in that conference's history.

By the mid-60's, in response to tremendous growth, the school began the transition into a four-year institution. In 1965, the school began offering baccalaureate degrees and changed its name to Boise College. 1967 was the final year for Boise at the two-year level as they moved to the NAIA as an independent. It was also Smith's final year as a coach, as he moved full-time into the athletic director role at Boise. Smith did not suffer a losing record in any of his 20 seasons as head coach.

In 1968, Boise College changed its name again to Boise State College, and the football program began four-year competition under new head coach Tony Knap.

Schedules

1933

Head Coach: Dusty Kline
Record: 1-2-1

1934

Head Coach: Max Eiden
Record: 4-3

1935

Head Coach: Max Eiden
Record: 4-4

1936

Head Coach: Max Eiden
Record: 3-4

1937

Head Coach: Max Eiden
Record: 0-6-1

1938

Head Coach: Harry Jacoby
Record: 2-4

1939

Head Coach: Harry Jacoby
Record: 4-2

^The Boise All-Stars were a team of former college players.

1940

Head Coach: Harry Jacoby
Record: 4-2

1941

Head Coaches: Harry Jacoby (first 4 games), George "Stub" Allison (last 3 games)
Record: 3-4

Boise Junior College fielded no intramural team from 1942 to 1945 due to World War II.

1946

Head Coach: Harry Jacoby
Record: 3-4-2

1947

Head Coach: Lyle Smith
Record: 9-0

1948

Head Coach: Lyle Smith
Record: 9-0^

^Boise State was undefeated in ICAC league play, but did not play enough conference opponents to be eligible for the conference championship.

1949

Head Coach: Lyle Smith
Record: 10-0
ICAC Champions
Potato Bowl Champions (Bakersfield, CA)

1950

Head Coaches: Lyle Smith (first three games), George Blankley (last seven games)
Record: 9-1
ICAC Champions

1951

Head Coach: George Blankley
Record: 9-1
ICAC Champions
Potato Bowl Champions

1952

Head Coach: Lyle Smith
Record: 8-1
ICAC Champions

1953

Head Coach: Lyle Smith
Record: 8-1
ICAC Champions
Bronco Bowl Champions

1954

Head Coach: Lyle Smith
Record: 9-1-1
ICAC Champions

1955

Head Coach: Lyle Smith
Record: 7-2
ICAC Champions

1956

Head Coach: Lyle Smith
Record: 8-0-1
ICAC Co-Champions

1957

Head Coach: Lyle Smith
Record: 9-1
ICAC Champions

1958

Head Coach: Lyle Smith
Record: 10-0
ICAC Champions
NJCAA National Champions

1959

Head Coach: Lyle Smith
Record: 7-2-1

1960

Head Coach: Lyle Smith
Record: 8-2
ICAC Champions

1961

Head Coach: Lyle Smith
Record: 9-1
ICAC Champions

1962

Head Coach: Lyle Smith
Record: 5-2-2

1963

Head Coach: Lyle Smith
Record: 5-3-1

1964

Head Coach: Lyle Smith
Record: 8-2

1965

Head Coach: Lyle Smith
Record: 9-2
ICAC Champions

1966

Head Coach: Lyle Smith
Record: 9-1
ICAC Champions

1967

Head Coach: Lyle Smith
Record: 6-4

References

Boise State

1933 establishments in Idaho
Idaho sports-related lists